The American cable channel TNT served as cable partner for the CBS broadcast television network during the 1992, 1994, and 1998 Winter Olympic Games, supplementing Olympics coverage in the United States.

History
While CBS was the American over-the-air television broadcaster for the 1992, 1994, and 1998 Winter Games, cable coverage was supplemented by TNT. The 1992 Winter Olympics in Albertville gave TNT 50 hours of programming in exchange for $50 million towards rights fees. This in return, allowed CBS to reduce their financial outlay by joining forces with TNT. TNT aired events under the promotional slogan "The ultimate daytime drama." Nick Charles and Fred Hickman hosted the coverage from Turner's Atlanta studios in 1992 and 1994, while Jim Lampley was the host in 1998.

Commentators

See also
NFL on TNT - TNT's coverage of the National Football League featured many personalities who worked for CBS at the same time
College Basketball on Turner Sports - CBS/Turner co-produced coverage of the NCAA Division I men's basketball tournament

References

External links
Sports on TNT
SI.com from CNN and Sports Illustrated
OLYMPICS AND TELEVISION
Olympic Commentators by Event History
CBS, Time Warner execs discuss Olympics TV bid
InBasline
The 1992 Winter Olympics (TNT)
The 1994 Winter Olympics (TNT)
XVIII Olympic Winter Games
Logos of Olympic Broadcasters - Part 5: 1990s

Turner Sports
TNT (American TV network) original programming
TNT
1990s American television series